The Personality Test is a British radio comedy broadcast on BBC Radio 4, which sees a weekly guest host present a series of questions about themselves to a panel consisting of comedians.

Along with regulars Sue Perkins, Lucy Porter and Robin Ince, panellists (previous and current) have included Will Smith, Alan Carr, Mark Dolan, Natalie Haynes, and Dan Tetsell.

Episodes (and Guest Hosts) 

 01-01 - 12.07.2006 - John Sergeant
 01-02 - 19.07.2006 - Greg Dyke
 01-03 - 26.07.2006 - Gyles Brandreth
 01-04 - 02.08.2006 - Jennie Bond
 02-01 - 07.12.2006 - Roy Hattersley
 02-02 - 14.12.2006 - Rick Wakeman
 02-03 - 21.12.2006 - Adam Hart-Davis
 02-04 - 28.12.2006 - Antony Worrall Thompson
 02-05 - 04.01.2007 - Claire Rayner
 02-06 - 11.01.2007 - Esther Rantzen
 03-01 - 05.07.2007 - Janet Street-Porter
 03-02 - 12.07.2007 - Lorraine Kelly
 03-03 - 19.07.2007 - Andrew Neil
 03-04 - 26.07.2007 - Edwina Currie
 03-05 - 02.08.2007 - Toyah Willcox
 03-06 - 09.08.2007 - Eve Pollard

References

External links

The Big Personality Test

BBC Radio comedy programmes
2006 radio programme debuts